Milton is a town in Caswell County, North Carolina, United States. The population was 166 at the 2010 census. It is adjacent to the Virginia International Raceway, just across the state line in Virginia.

The town's name was derived from its beginnings as Mill Town. A mill was established prior to the incorporation of the town.

History
It was the home of Caleb Hazard and Mary Dodson Richmond during the mid-19th century. General Stephen Dodson Ramseur, a distinguished American Civil War hero, was a nephew of Caleb Hazard and Mary Dodson Richmond and stayed with them while recuperating from injuries received in the Battle of Malvern Hill. While there he fell in love with their daughter, Ellen, and they were married in the parlor. Ramseur was killed almost a year later at the Battle of Cedar Creek. Three days after his death, their only daughter was born at Woodside. A historic marker stands at the front of the yard to honor Ramseur. Inside the house is the book about him, titled Lee's Gallant General. The parlor where the marriage took place is named the Ramseur Parlor, and the portraits of General and Mrs. Ramseur are highlighted in two recessed alcoves in remembrance of their story.

Milton is the northernmost point of the Colonial Heritage Byway. Founded in 1796, Milton is also notable for being the home of Thomas Day, a  free Black man who was a renowned cabinetmaker. Day had a workshop and residence in the historic Union Tavern building that is in the process of being restored through an ongoing restoration campaign. Fire damaged the building in 1989.

In addition to Woodside, Longwood, Milton Historic District, Milton State Bank, and Union Tavern are listed on the National Register of Historic Places.

Geography
Milton is located in northeastern Caswell County at  (36.536679, -79.208166), just to the east of the Dan River. The town is bordered to the north by the state line, with Halifax County, Virginia, to the north.

North Carolina Highways 57 and 62 intersect in the center of town. NC 57 leads southeast  to Roxboro, while NC 62 leads southwest  to Yanceyville, the Caswell County seat. NC 62 turns northwest in Milton, crosses the Dan River, and becomes Virginia State Route 62, which leads northwest to U.S. Route 58.

Demographics

As of the census of 2010, there were 166 people, 65 households, and 41 families residing in the town. The population density was 346.8 people per square mile (134.1/km2). There were 86 housing units at an average density of 226.0 per square mile (87.4/km2). The racial makeup of the town was 58.33% White, 40.91% African American, and 0.76% from two or more races. Hispanic or Latino of any race were 0.76% of the population.

There were 65 households, out of which 10.8% had children under the age of 18 living with them, 43.1% were married couples living together, 15.4% had a female householder with no husband present, and 36.9% were non-families. 33.8% of all households were made up of individuals, and 20.0% had someone living alone who was 65 years of age or older. The average household size was 2.03 and the average family size was 2.51.

In the town, the population was spread out, with 12.1% under the age of 18, 5.3% from 18 to 24, 21.2% from 25 to 44, 26.5% from 45 to 64, and 34.8% who were 65 years of age or older. The median age was 52 years. For every 100 females, there were 63.0 males. For every 100 females age 18 and over, there were 61.1 males.

The median income for a household in the town was $37,917, and the median income for a family was $41,750. Males had a median income of $35,000 versus $20,625 for females. The per capita income for the town was $20,343. There were 11.8% of families and 19.9% of the population living below the poverty line, including 43.5% of under eighteens and 17.0% of those over 64.

References

Towns in Caswell County, North Carolina